Troy Township is one of the eighteen townships of Delaware County, Ohio, United States. As of the 2010 census the population was 2,115, down from 2,665 at the 2000 census.

Geography
Located in the northwestern part of the county, it borders the following townships:
Marlboro Township - north
Oxford Township - northeast
Brown Township - southeast
Delaware Township - south
Radnor Township - west

Part of the city of Delaware, the county seat of Delaware County, is located in southern Troy Township.

Name and history
Troy Township was organized in 1816.

It is one of seven Troy Townships statewide.

Government
The township is governed by a three-member board of trustees, who are elected in November of odd-numbered years to a four-year term beginning on the following January 1. Two are elected in the year after the presidential election and one is elected in the year before it. There is also an elected township fiscal officer, who serves a four-year term beginning on April 1 of the year after the election, which is held in November of the year before the presidential election. Vacancies in the fiscal officership or on the board of trustees are filled by the remaining trustees.

Public services
Emergency medical services in Concord Township are provided by the Delaware County EMS.

References

External links
County website

Townships in Delaware County, Ohio
Townships in Ohio